Andrea Agostinelli (born 20 April 1957) is an Italian football coach and former professional footballer. He played as midfielder.

Coaching career
In April 2013, he was hired by Varese as coach.

Career Statistics

References

1957 births
Living people
Sportspeople from Ancona
Italian footballers
Association football midfielders
Italy under-21 international footballers
Serie A players
Serie B players
Serie C players
S.S. Lazio players
S.S.C. Napoli players
U.S. Pistoiese 1921 players
Modena F.C. players
Atalanta B.C. players
U.S. Avellino 1912 players
U.S. Lecce players
Genoa C.F.C. players
Mantova 1911 players
A.S. Lodigiani players
Italian football managers
Mantova 1911 managers
U.S. Pistoiese 1921 managers
Ternana Calcio managers
Piacenza Calcio 1919 managers
S.S.C. Napoli managers
F.C. Crotone managers
U.S. Triestina Calcio 1918 managers
U.S. Salernitana 1919 managers
S.S.D. Varese Calcio managers
FK Partizani Tirana managers
KF Skënderbeu Korçë managers
Italian expatriate football managers
Expatriate football managers in Albania
Italian expatriate sportspeople in Albania
Footballers from Marche